The Lehigh Valley Storm team was a recreational football program that competed in Gridiron Developmental Football League. The Lehigh Valley Storm played at Salisbury High School football field in Salisbury Township, Pennsylvania.

2013 season
The 2013 regular season ended with the Lehigh Valley Storm going 8–2 only losing to Central Penn Piranha and Lancaster Lightning. Their biggest win of the season came against the Capital City Atoms whom they beat 63–0. In the playoffs they went 3–1 beating Fayetteville Horizon in the first round 42–14, Northeast Ohio Silverback in the second round 27–6, and Panhandle Crusaders in the conference championship game 31–24. They lost in the Gridiron Bowl IV to the Oklahoma Thunder 8–56.

Season-by-season

|-
| colspan="6" style="text-align:center;"| Lehigh Valley Storm  (GDFL)
|-
|2013 || 11 || 3 || 0 || Keystone Division || Loss Championship (Oklahoma Thunder)
|-
|2014 || 0 || 0 || 0 ||  ||

References

Semi-professional American football
American football teams in Pennsylvania
Sports in Allentown, Pennsylvania
2010 establishments in Pennsylvania
American football teams established in 2010